Sarcophaga subvicina is a species of fly in the family Sarcophagidae. It is found in the Palearctic.

References

External links
Images representing Sarcophaga at BOLD

Sarcophagidae
Insects described in 1937
Diptera of Europe
Taxa named by Nikolay Ilyich Baranov